Scrobipalpa monochromella is a moth in the family Gelechiidae. It was described by Constant in 1895. It is found in southern France, Italy, Corsica, Sicily and Ukraine.

The larvae feed on Limonium vulgare. They live between spun leaves or as a leaf miner.

References

Scrobipalpa
Moths described in 1895